= Michel Goujon =

French writer

Michel Goujon is a French writer. He was born in Saint-Tropez. He worked for many years for a publishing firm before becoming a literary agent. He is the author of several books including La Madrague (Liana Levi, 2009), L’Autre Saint-Tropez (Michel Lafon, 2017), and La Recluse (Plon, 2019).
